How I Learned to Stop Giving a Shit and Love Mindless Self Indulgence is the fifth and final studio album by Mindless Self Indulgence. The album was funded through a Kickstarter campaign started on October 25, 2012, which reached its goal on December 24, 2012. After several demos were released via YouTube, the album began production. The cover art and track listing were released for people who had backed the campaign on March 12, 2013. Digital downloads from Kickstarter were released on March 13, 2013. The official album release occurred on May 14, 2013. The album was released through Metropolis Records with a bonus track; a cover of Supertramp's "The Logical Song". The name of the record is a reference to the film Dr. Strangelove or: How I Learned to Stop Worrying and Love the Bomb and a reflection of the band "being themselves and loving the work that they do".

Critical reception
The album generally received positive reviews. David Jeffries of Allmusic described the album as "the loudest, angriest, and most creative kraken since their 2005 album You'll Rebel to Anything," while also writing: "Think Ministry on helium and without the "do good" attitude, then sign up for duty, but only if your karma can take a significant hit." Derek Staples of Consequence of Sound wrote: "Although MSI’s messages generally lack the depth of electro-punk/industrial brethren like KMFDM, they’re still capable of divulging wisdom beneath a cloak of tongue-in-cheek satire."

Track listing

Personnel
How I Learned to Stop Giving a Shit and Love Mindless Self Indulgence album personnel adapted from digital download liner notes.

Mindless Self Indulgence
Jimmy Urine – vocals
Steve, Righ? – guitars
Kitty – drums
Lyn-Z – bass

Additional personnel
Jimmy Urine – production, arrangements
Chantal Claret – guest vocals on tracks 5, 7, 8, 10, and 13
Rhys Fulber – mixing, additional production
Rob Kleiner – additional vocal production on track 1
Greg Reely – mastering
Jorden Haley – album art
Jennifer Dunn – additional design
Jeremy Saffer – photography

References

External links

2013 albums
Electropunk albums
Kickstarter-funded albums
Mindless Self Indulgence albums